Noradrenergic cell groups refers to collections of neurons in the central nervous system that have been demonstrated by histochemical fluorescence to contain the neurotransmitter norepinephrine (noradrenalin). They are named 
 Noradrenergic cell group A1
 Noradrenergic cell group A2
 Noradrenergic cell group A4
 Noradrenergic cell group A5
 Noradrenergic cell group A6
 Noradrenergic cell group A7
Noradrenergic cell group A6sc
 Noradrenergic cell group Acg

See also
Adrenergic cell groups

References

External links 
 More information at BrainInfo

Norepinephrine